Fowkes is a surname of English, ultimately of Norman-French, origin. Notable people with the surname include:

 Charles Christopher Fowkes (1894–1966), British army major-general
 Conard Fowkes (1933–2009), American actor
 Maja and Reuben Fowkes (active from 2006), British museum curators and art historians
 Mary Fowkes (1954–2020), American physician
 Robert Fowkes (1913–1998), American linguist

See also 
 Fowkes Formation, a geological formation in Wyoming, U.S.A.
 Fowkes hypothesis, a first order approximation in physics named after F. M. Fowkes
 Fowkes v Pascoe, an English trusts law case of 1875
 Richards, Fowkes & Co., American builders of historical-style mechanical-action pipe organs
 Fawkes (disambiguation)
 Folkes, a surname
 Foulkes, a surname
 Fowke, a surname
 Vaulx (disambiguation)
 Vaux (disambiguation)